A clementine (Citrus × clementina) is a tangor, a citrus fruit hybrid between a willowleaf mandarin orange (C. × deliciosa) and a sweet orange (C. × sinensis), named in honor of Clément Rodier, a French missionary who first discovered and propagated the cultivar in Algeria.  The exterior is a deep orange colour with a smooth, glossy appearance. Clementines can be separated into 7 to 14 segments. Similar to tangerines, they tend to be easy to peel. They are typically juicy and sweet, with less acid than oranges. Their oils, like other citrus fruits, contain mostly limonene as well as myrcene, linalool, α-pinene and many complex aromatics.

History

The clementine is a spontaneous citrus hybrid that arose in the late 19th century in Misserghin, Algeria, in the garden of the orphanage of the French Missionary Brother Clément Rodier, for whom it would be formally named in 1902.  Some sources have attributed an earlier origin for the hybrid, pointing to similar fruit native to the provinces of Guangxi and Guangdong in present-day China, but these are likely distinct mandarin hybrids, and genomic analysis of the clementine has shown it to have arisen from a cross between a sweet orange (Citrus × sinensis) and the Mediterranean willowleaf mandarin (Citrus × deliciosa), consistent with Algerian origin.

There are three types of clementines: seedless clementines, clementines (maximum of 10 seeds), and Monreal (more than 10 seeds). Clementines resemble other citrus varieties such as the satsuma and tangerines.

Cultivation
Clementines differ from other citrus in having lower heat requirement, which means the tolerance to fruit maturity and sensitivity to unfavorable conditions during the flowering and fruit-setting period is higher. However, in regions of high total heat, the Clementine bears fruit early; only slightly later than satsuma mandarins. These regions such as North Africa, Mediterranean basin, and California, also favor maximizing the Clementine size and quality. As a result, the tastiest Clementines are from these hot regions.

It was introduced into California commercial agriculture in 1914, though it was grown at the Citrus Research Center (now part of the University of California, Riverside) as early as 1909.
Clementines lose their desirable seedless characteristic when they are cross-pollinated with other fruit. In 2006, to prevent this, growers such as Paramount Citrus in California threatened to sue local beekeepers to keep bees away from their crops.

Types 

 Seedless – exists in North Africa. Seedless versions of the clementine are known as the common type (seedless or practically seedless). Common Clementines are very similar to the Monreal type; the two types are virtually identical in terms of tree specifics. The seedless Clementine tree is self-incompatible; which is why the fruit has so few or no seeds. In order to be pollinated, it needs to be cross-pollinated.
 Monreal – exists in North Africa. The Monreal clementine can self-pollinate and has seeds. Monreal clementines are on average larger than the seedless variety, has a more abundant bloom and is sweeter.
 Sweetclems — are typically grown in Spain and northern Africa. Unlike other Clementine varieties, they usually have 10 slices. They are slightly smaller than "common" clementines. They have a sweet taste, as suggested by their name, but it is not overbearing and quite mild.

Varieties

 Algerian, the original Rodier cultivar.
 Fina, a Spanish cultivar originally grown on a bitter orange rootstock that gave it superb flavor, but due to disease vulnerability is now grown on a broader range of rootstocks, affecting the flavor profile.
 Clemenules or Nules – A popular, seedless, easy to peel clementine with a very pleasing sweet flavor. A mutation of the Fina variety, Nules is the most widely planted clementine in Spain, where it matures from mid-November to mid to late-January. Also widely planted in California, where it matures from October to December.  It produces seedless fruit that is larger than the Fina, but less sweet. 
 Clementine del Golfo di Taranto, a (practically) seedless Italian cultivar given Protected geographical indication (PGI) status by the European Union, produced around the Gulf of Taranto. They have a sweet flavour and an intense aroma.
Clementine di Calabria, another Italian PGI variety, grown in the Calabria region.

Nutrition

A clementine contains 87% water, 12% carbohydrates, and negligible amounts of fat and protein (table). Among micronutrients, only vitamin C is in significant content (59% of the Daily Value) in a 100 gram reference serving, with all other nutrients in low amounts.

Potential drug interactions
A 2017 study indicated that clementine phytochemicals may interact with drugs in a manner similar to those of grapefruit.

See also

 Clementine cake
 List of foods named after people
 Apulian Cuisine
 List of Italian products with protected designation of origin

References 

Agriculture in California
Citrus hybrids
Fruit trees
Cuisine of Apulia
Agriculture in Italy
Italian products with protected designation of origin